Edina Gangl (born 25 June 1990) is a Hungarian water polo goalkeeper. At the 2012, 2016 and 2020 Summer Olympics, she competed for the Hungary women's national water polo team in the women's tournament.

See also
 Hungary women's Olympic water polo team records and statistics
 List of women's Olympic water polo tournament goalkeepers

References

External links
 

1990 births
Living people
Hungarian female water polo players
Water polo goalkeepers
Water polo players at the 2012 Summer Olympics
Water polo players at the 2016 Summer Olympics
Water polo players at the 2020 Summer Olympics
Universiade medalists in water polo
Universiade silver medalists for Hungary
Medalists at the 2013 Summer Universiade
Medalists at the 2020 Summer Olympics
Olympic bronze medalists for Hungary in water polo
People from Mosonmagyaróvár
Sportspeople from Győr-Moson-Sopron County
World Aquatics Championships medalists in water polo
21st-century Hungarian women